Hassane Alla  (born 24 November 1980) is a Moroccan footballer who most recently played as a midfielder for French side US Boulogne.

Alla has represented the Morocco national football team 6 times.

References

External links
 lfp.fr 
 sport24.com 
 

1980 births
Living people
People from Oujda
Association football midfielders
Moroccan footballers
Morocco international footballers
Moroccan expatriate footballers
MC Oujda players
Le Havre AC players
Stade Lavallois players
US Boulogne players
Ligue 1 players
Ligue 2 players
Championnat National players
Championnat National 2 players
2004 African Cup of Nations players
Expatriate footballers in France